Alvin Leon Roth (November 6, 1914 – April 18, 2007) was an American bridge player, considered one of the greatest of all time, and "the premier bidding theorist of his bridge generation". He wrote several books on the game, and invented various bidding conventions that have become commonplace, including five-card majors, negative doubles, forcing notrump, and the unusual notrump. Roth was considered a fascinating theorist but was described by one partner, Richard "Dick" Freeman, as "very tough to sit opposite—unless you were so thick-skinned that no insult was severe enough to hurt, or you were willing to make extreme sacrifices to get on a winning side."

Biography

Roth was born in The Bronx. He graduated from Stuyvesant High School and studied mathematics at City College of New York, where he discovered bridge. Roth then took a job as a government statistician in Washington, D.C. He served in the US Army in World War II, where he met future bridge partner Tobias Stone, then returned to New York City.

He played for the United States or North America in the Bermuda Bowl world team championships of 1955, 1958, and 1967, losing the final each time. He also won a silver medal with the US team in the 1968 World Team Olympiad.

Roth was a Grand Life Master of the American Contract Bridge League, and a World Life Master of the World Bridge Federation.

After attending a bridge tournament in Miami Beach, Roth moved there and ran a bridge club for five years. Then he founded the Charles Goren School of Bridge in Washington and ran it for ten years. Roth then purchased the Mayfair Club in New York, which he managed until retiring to Florida in 1995.

Roth married twice, first to Fay Edelstein in 1940. They had a son, but were divorced in 1963, and she died in 1995. He married his second wife, Jean Farrell, in 1980.

Roth died of natural causes in Boca Raton.

Bridge accomplishments

Honors
 ACBL Hall of Fame, 1995

Awards
 Fishbein Trophy 1963, 1965, 1966
 Herman Trophy 1952

Wins
 North American Bridge Championships (30)
 Vanderbilt (3) 1943, 1963, 1968
 Spingold (6) 1940, 1956, 1957, 1963, 1966, 1967
 Chicago (now Reisinger) (3) 1946, 1952, 1961
 Reisinger (1) 1967
 Men's Board-a-Match Teams (4) 1955, 1961, 1969, 1971
 Master Mixed Teams (4) 1952, 1953, 1955, 1965
 Life Master Pairs (3) 1956, 1971, 1972
 Fall National Open Pairs (1) 1942
 Open Pairs (1) 1960
 Rockwell Mixed Pairs (2) 1946, 1952
 Hilliard Mixed Pairs (1) 1959
 Master Individual (1) 1943

Runners-up
 Bermuda Bowl (3) 1955, 1958, 1967
 World Open Team Olympiad (1) 1968
 Olympiad Mixed Teams (1) 1972
 North American Bridge Championships (23)
 Vanderbilt (2) 1953, 1975
 Spingold (4) 1943, 1945, 1953, 1961
 Chicago (now Reisinger) (2) 1937, 1954
 Reisinger (1) 1966
 Men's Board-a-Match Teams (4) 1952, 1957, 1973, 1977
 Master Mixed Teams (5) 1945, 1963, 1966, 1973, 1975
 Life Master Pairs (1) 1965
 Fall National Open Pairs (1) 1958
 Open Pairs (2) 1958, 1966
 Master Individual (1) 1955
 United States Bridge Championships (1)
 Open Pair Trials (1) 1967

Publications
Books
 176 pages.
 237 pages.
 512 pages.
 216 pages.
 237 pages. Preface revised by Alvin Roth.

 317 pages.
Pamphlets
 Negative Doubles (Louisville: Devyn Press, 1981), Championship Bridge no. 5
 The Unusual No Trump (Devyn, 1981), Championship Bridge no. 11

References

External links
 

 

1914 births
2007 deaths
American contract bridge players
Bermuda Bowl players
Contract bridge writers
Sportspeople from the Bronx
People from Boca Raton, Florida